The 1972 British Motor Cars Invitational, also known as the BMC Invitational, was a women's tennis tournament that took place on indoor carpet courts at the Civic Auditorium in San Francisco in the United States. It was the second edition of the event and was held from January 12 through January 15, 1972. First-seeded Billie Jean King won the singles title, her second consecutive at the event, and earned $3,400 first-prize money.

Finals

Singles
 Billie Jean King defeated  Kerry Melville 7–6(5–0), 7–6(5–2)

Doubles
 Rosie Casals /  Virginia Wade defeated  Françoise Dürr /  Judy Dalton 6–3, 5–7, 6–2

Prize money

References

BMC Invitational
British Motor Cars Invitational
Silicon Valley Classic
British Motor Cars Invitational
British Motor Cars Invitational